Uptagrafft is a surname. Notable people with the surname include:

 Eric Uptagrafft (born 1966), American sport shooter
 Sandra Uptagrafft (born 1971), American female sport shooter